Bloemfontein is a city, one of three national capitals of South Africa.

Bloemfontein may also refer to:

 the Anglican Diocese of the Free State, formerly the Diocese of Bloemfontein
 the Roman Catholic Archdiocese of Bloemfontein
 Bloemfontein High School, in the city
 , a Canadian Second World War minesweeper named Rosamund, purchased by the South African Navy in 1947 and renamed